Cold Spring Farm Springhouse is a historic springhouse located in Delaware Water Gap National Recreation Area at Middle Smithfield Township, Monroe County, Pennsylvania. It was built in the late-19th century and is a one-story, rectangular fieldstone building. It has a wood shingle roof and small cupola. Also on the property is a concrete dam, built about 1909. It represents a typical springhouse of the Delaware River Valley.

It was added to the National Register of Historic Places in 1979.

References

Agricultural buildings and structures on the National Register of Historic Places in Pennsylvania
Infrastructure completed in 1909
Buildings and structures in Monroe County, Pennsylvania
Water supply infrastructure on the National Register of Historic Places
National Register of Historic Places in Monroe County, Pennsylvania
Spring houses
Delaware Water Gap National Recreation Area